Illarikam is a 1959 Indian Telugu-language comedy drama film directed by T. Prakash Rao. It stars Akkineni Nageswara Rao and Jamuna, with music composed by T. Chalapathi Rao. It was produced by A. V. Subba Rao under the Prasad Art Pictures banner. The film had a Silver Jubilee run and was recorded as a Blockbuster at the box office.

Illarikam literally means a bridegroom going to the bride's family and living permanently with them (matrilocality); as against the custom of the bride going into the groom's family (patrilocality). This custom is observed in some rich families where the bride is the only child to their parents.

Illarikam was remade in four languages. L. V. Prasad produced the Hindi version titled Sasural (1961), which T. Prakash Rao directed. A. V. Subbarao himself remade it in Kannada as Mane Aliya (1964), in Malayalam as Kalithozhan (1966) and in Tamil as Maadi Veettu Mappilai (1967). All these versions were box office hits.

Plot 
Venu (Akkineni Nageswara Rao) is an orphan brought up by his maternal uncle Dharmayya (Ramana Reddy). He falls in love with the Zamindar's (Gummadi) daughter Radha (Jamuna). He married with a condition that Venu should live in their house, called Illarikam.

Due to status-consciousness, Sundaramma (Hemalatha), wife of the Zamindar, looks down on Venu and insults him indirectly. Govindayya (C. S. R. Anjaneyulu), cousin of Sundaramma and also manager of their mica factories creates problems between Venu and Radha because he plots to usurp the wealth. So, he brings his wayward son Seshagiri (R. Nageswara Rao) weaning him away from Kanakadurga (Girija), whom he had secretly married.

Venu spots Kanakadurga, his presumed to be dead sister, while she was performing on stage. Not knowing they are siblings, Radha suspects Venu's fidelity. The villains try to cash in on their rift. When things are getting worse, Venu wears a Zorro-like guise, teaches Govindayya and his son a lesson, and paves the way for a happy family reunion.

Cast 
Akkineni Nageswara Rao as Venu
Jamuna as Radha
Gummadi as Zamindar
Relangi as Brahmanandam
Ramana Reddy as Dharmayya
C.S.R. as Govindayya
R. Nageswara Rao as Sadanandam/Seshagiri
Allu Ramalingaiah as Panakalu
Peketi Sivaram
Hemalatha as Sundaramma
Girija as Kanakadurga
T. G. Kamala Devi as Zamindar's sister
Bala as Savithri
Surabhi Kamalabai
 Boddapati

Production 
After releasing the dubbed version of the Tamil film Uthamaputhiran in Telugu, A. V. Subbarao announced his next project Illarikam, with Nageswara Rao, based on the story of Vemapti Sadasivabrahmam. Jamuna was selected to pair with ANR. The pair had earlier collaborated in Nirupedalu (1954). Nageswara Rao suggested to remove the song "Niluvave Vaalu Kanuladaana" as he felt the audience may not like the teasing song, as by then the heroine had realised the truth, but the producer and the director felt otherwise. After its release, seeing the audience response to that song, Nageswara Rao conceded that he was wrong. T. Rama Rao started his career as an assistant director with Illarikam.

Music 
Music was composed by T. Chalapathi Rao.

Remakes 
Illarikam was remade in four languages. L. V. Prasad produced the Hindi version titled Sasural (1961), which T. Prakash Rao directed. A. V. Subbarao himself remade it in Kannada as Mane Aliya (1964), in Malayalam as Kalithozhan (1966) and in Tamil as Maadi Veettu Mappilai (1967). All these versions were box office hits.

References

External links 
 

1950s Telugu-language films
1959 comedy-drama films
1959 films
Films directed by T. Prakash Rao
Films scored by T. Chalapathi Rao
Indian black-and-white films
Indian comedy-drama films
Telugu films remade in other languages